The Quintana Roo Tigers, formerly known as the Mexico (City) Tigers  are a professional baseball team in the Mexican League based in Cancún, Quintana Roo, Mexico. The team is part of the Southern Division. The team has won twelve championships to date: 1955, 1960, 1965, 1966, 1992, 1997, 2000, 2001, 2005, 2011, 2013, and 2015.

The Tigres were founded in Mexico City in 1955 and played there through the 2006 season. The team was founded by industrial businessman Alejo Peralta, and was long owned by his son, Carlos Peralta. The team was purchased by an ownership group including Major League Baseball All-Star pitcher Fernando Valenzuela in 2017.

The Tigres won the Mexican League championship in their inaugural season, an achievement that has never been matched, and was dubbed: "". The Tigres are a perennial powerhouse and have won 18 division and 12 league championships since their inception.

Franchise history
On 14 April 1955, the Tigres made their debut at the Julio Molina ballpark in Mérida, Yucatán. Their inaugural game represented the determination of entrepreneurs Don Alejo Peralta and Díaz Cevallos to support the sport that by then was submerged in a financial crisis.

Tigres Capitalinos
The Tigres played in Mexico City from its inception until 2001, when the team moved to Puebla City. The team was known as Tigres del México o Tigres Capitalinos. During these years, the team played at the Parque del Seguro Social and later at the Foro Sol, starting in 2000, after the Parque del Seguro Social was demolished in order to build a shopping mall. 

On their last two seasons in Mexico City, the Tigres won back to back championships, defeating rivals Diablos Rojos del México.

Move to Puebla
In 2002, the team moved to Puebla and changed its name to Tigres de la Angelópolis.

50th anniversary season
In commemoration of their first 50 years of competition, an alternate logo was designed in 2005. The Tigres played their 50th season relying only on Mexican players, making the championship more significant. Furthermore, the 2005 season was named "Ing. Alejo Peralta" in memory of the Tigres' founder and father of the then-owner.

New home for 2007
At the end of the 2006 season, the club's president, Carlos Peralta, announced that the team would move to the city of Cancún, Quintana Roo. The team was renamed the Quintana Roo Tigres, and began play in Beto Ávila Stadium.

Carrillo and Vizcarra era (2009–present)
For the 2009 season, Enrique "Che" Reyes was replaced by Matías Carrillo as manager. Carrillo, a former major league player for the Florida Marlins, had been a successful player for Tigres from the late 1990s to the mid-2000s having won five championships as player. The Tigres continued to be a competitive squad under Carrillo and reached the 2009 final series, but lost to Saraperos de Saltillo. It was two years later, in 2011, when the team reached the final once more, this time facing their perennial rival: the Diablos Rojos del Mexico.

2011 championship
In 2011, the Tigres and Diablos would play their eighth finals series against each other since 1966. The Tigres entered the 2011 series as an underdog. Nevertheless, the best-out-of-seven series ended with a 4–0 sweep against Diablos before a sell-out crowd (with a large presence of Tigres supporters) at Foro Sol.

2013 championship
Despite injuries to key Tigres players, the team won its eleventh championship against the Sultanes de Monterrey, 4–1, in a best-out-of-seven series.

Championship games

Logos and colors

Roster

Retired numbers

Mexican Baseball Hall of Famers
The following Hall of Famers played and/or managed for the Tigres.

Notable players 

 Julio Franco (First Baseman)
Tyler Herron (1986-2021) (Pitcher)
 Fernando "el Pulpo" Remes (Shortstop)
 Ismael Valdez (Pitcher)
 Pablo Ortega (Pitcher)
 Karim García (Outfielder)
 Jorge Cantú (Infielder)
 Daryle Ward (First baseman/Outfielder)

References

External links 
  

Baseball teams in Mexico
Sports teams in Cancún
Baseball teams established in 1955
Mexican League teams
1955 establishments in Mexico